Thomas Owen  (born 1861) was a Welsh international footballer. He was part of the Wales national football team, playing 1 match on 18 January 1879 against England.

See also
 List of Wales international footballers (alphabetical)

References

1861 births
Welsh footballers
Wales international footballers
Place of birth missing
Year of death missing
Association footballers not categorized by position